Ercall Wood Academy is a co-educational secondary school located in Wellington in the English county of Shropshire.

It is an academy converter and is a member of the Learning Community Trust. The school was formerly called Ercall Wood Technology College but changed its name when it joined the trust in June 2018.

References

External links
Ercall Wood Academy official website

Secondary schools in Telford and Wrekin
Academies in Telford and Wrekin